
Year 267 BC was a year of the pre-Julian Roman calendar. At the time it was known as the Year of the Consulship of Regulus and Libo (or, less frequently, year 487 Ab urbe condita). The denomination 267 BC for this year has been used since the early medieval period, when the Anno Domini calendar era became the prevalent method in Europe for naming years.

Events 
 By place 
 Greece 
 Macedonia's King Antigonus II Gonatas has to deal with a rebellion by an Athenian-led coalition of Spartans (led by King Areus I of Sparta), Athenians (led by Chremonides), Arcadians and Achaeans that tries to expel the Macedonian forces located in southern Greece. The rebellion has the support of Ptolemy II of Egypt.

Births 
 Berenice II, queen and co-regent of Egypt (or 266 BC)

Deaths 
 Devanampiya Tissa, ruler of Anuradhapura (Sri Lanka)

References